Count Screwloose is a character in the comic strip Count Screwloose from Tooloose by Milt Gross, introduced on February 17, 1929. The count is portrayed as a mentally ill man who frequently leaves Nuttycrest Sanitarium, the insane asylum where he resides, to go out into the rest of the world. There he often meets people who act crazier than he did and thus he always goes back, telling his dog Iggy: "Iggy, keep an eye on me", which became a national catchphrase at the time. The series was discontinued in 1935.

In 1937, the comic strip was adapted into a short-lived cartoon series by Metro-Goldwyn-Mayer. Two cartoons were released in 1939.

History
The Metro-Goldwyn-Mayer cartoon studio brought in established newspaper cartoonist Milt Gross in an attempt to both bolster the Captain and the Kids product and create original properties for MGM, but his tenure at the studio was short-lived. Gross managed to complete two cartoons, Jitterbug Follies and Wanted: No Master, with his characters Count Screwloose of Tooloose and J.R. the Wonder Dog.
 Jitterbug Follies
 Wanted: No Master

References

American comic strips
1929 comics debuts
1935 comics endings
Film series introduced in 1939
Count Screwloose
MGM cartoon characters
Metro-Goldwyn-Mayer animated short films
Comics adapted into animated series
Screwloose
Screwloose, Count
Screwloose, Count
Screwloose, Count
Gag-a-day comics
Screwloose, Count
Screwloose, Count
Screwloose, Count
Metro-Goldwyn-Mayer cartoon studio film series